Last of the Red Hot Burritos is the fourth album by country rock group The Flying Burrito Brothers, released in 1972. By the time this album was recorded, "Sneaky" Pete Kleinow and Bernie Leadon had left the band, leaving Chris Hillman as the sole founding member. In their places, Hillman recruited Al Perkins and Kenny Wertz respectively. Wertz had previously played with Hillman in the Scottsville Squirrel Barkers. The band also added two guest musicians for their fall 1971 tour in Byron Berline and Roger Bush from Country Gazette. This lineup toured until Hillman left the band in October 1971, leaving the rights to the band's name to Rick Roberts. Once Hillman departed, A&M Records apparently lost faith in the group. Instead of allowing a Roberts-led version of the band (with no founding members) to record a new studio album, A&M released this live recording.  It fulfilled the band's contract, but it was subsequently dropped from the label.

A group of Burritos led by Rick Roberts would continue to tour Europe with no original members into 1973 (to meet contractual obligations), at which point the band was officially dissolved by Roberts, bringing the original Flying Burrito Brothers to an end.  (A new version of the Burritos would resurface in 1975, signed to Columbia Records.)

Track listing

Bonus tracks on the 2008 Sierra Records reissue:
"Wake Up Little Susie" (Felice and Boudleaux Bryant) – 3:29
"Money Honey" (Jesse Stone) – 3:20
"One Hundred Years from Now" (Gram Parsons) – 2:35

Personnel
reference for personnel section:
The Flying Burrito Brothers
 Chris Hillman - vocals, bass, mandolin
 Rick Roberts - vocals, rhythm guitar
 Al Perkins - pedal steel guitar, lead electric guitar
 Kenny Wertz - vocals, guitar, banjo
 Michael Clarke - drums
guests:
 Byron Berline - fiddle
 Roger Bush - acoustic bass, acoustic guitar (overdubbed) on "Orange Blossom Special", lead vocal on "Don't Let Your Deal Go Down"
 Earl P. Ball or Spooner Oldham -  piano (overdubbed) on "High Fashion Queen" and "Losing Game"
 Bernie Leadon (possible) -  guitar (overdubbed)

References 

The Flying Burrito Brothers albums
1972 live albums
A&M Records live albums